Mikado may refer to:

 Emperor of Japan or

Arts and entertainment
 The Mikado, an 1885 comic opera by Gilbert and Sullivan
 The Mikado (1939 film), an adaptation of the opera, directed by Victor Schertzinger
 The Mikado (1967 film), an adaptation of the opera, directed by Stuart Burge
 "The Mikado" (Millennium), a 1998 television episode
 Mikado (game), a pick-up sticks game
 "Mikado" (song), by Simone Drexel, the Swiss entry in the Eurovision Song Contest 1975
 Mikado, a DC Comics character

Biology 
 Mikado pheasant (Syrmaticus mikado)
 Mikado, a genus of beetles in family Ptiliidae
 'Mikado', a cultivar of Syngonanthus chrysanthus
 Forficula mikado, a species of earwig in the family Forficulidae
 Kempina mikado, a species of mantis shrimp in the family Squillidae

Places
 Mikado Glacier, a glacier in Alexander Island, Antarctica
 Mikado, Saskatchewan, a hamlet in Canada
 Mikado station (Saskatchewan), a flag stop in Mikado, Saskatchewan, Canada
 Mikado Station, a railway station in Isumi, Chiba Prefecture, Japan
 Mikado Township, Michigan, a civil township in the U.S.
 Mikado, Michigan, an unincorporated community

Other uses 
 Mikado (biscuit), a European marketing name for Pocky
 Mikado (locomotive), any steam locomotive using the 2-8-2 wheel arrangement.
 Mikado yellow, a color
 Operation Mikado, a military plan by the United Kingdom in the Falklands War
 Michel Warschawski or Mikado (born 1949), Israeli activist

See also
 Shiina "Misha" Mikado, a character in the visual novel Katawa Shoujo
 Mikado Sanzenin, a character in Ranma ½
 Mikado Ryūgamine, a character in Durarara!!